Scutellonema is a genus of nematodes belonging to the family Hoplolaimidae.

The species of this genus are found in Southern Hemisphere.

Species:

Scutellonema abberans
Scutellonema blaberum
Scutellonema brachyurum 
Scutellonema bradys 
Scutellonema christiei
Scutellonema clathricaudatum 
Scutellonema clavicaudatum 
Scutellonema siamense 
Scutellonema unum

References

Nematodes